The following is a list of works of painting, sculpture and architecture by the Italian Renaissance artist Michelangelo. Lost works are included, but not commissions that Michelangelo never made. Michelangelo also left many drawings, sketches, and some works in poetry.

Sculpture

Attributed sculpture

Painting

Attributed paintings

Architecture

Presentation drawings and cartoons

Notes

External links

Michelangelo
Michel

he:מיכלאנג'לו#רשימת יצירותיו